The Middle East Radio Forum is a radio show produced and hosted by attorney William J Wolf. It airs on Sundays at 12PM MST(No DST) on 960AM KKNT in Phoenix Arizona. The Middle East Radio Forum is also available streamed live from KKNT and past shows can be listened to in the podcast format on both SoundCloud.

References 

American radio programs